2C-T-8 is a psychedelic phenethylamine of the 2C family.  It was first synthesized by Alexander Shulgin, sometimes used as an entheogen.

Chemistry

The full name of the chemical is 2,5-dimethoxy-4-cyclopropylmethylthiophenethylamine.  The compound is reported to have a bad taste and smell.

Effects

In his book PiHKAL, Shulgin lists the dosage range as 30 to 50 mg. 2C-T-8 is generally taken orally and effects typically last 10 to 15 hours.  Experiences have varied between insight and creativity at low doses to hypersensitivity and paranoia at higher doses. A "thinking-connection" that is characteristic of the 2C-T group is evident in this chemical in stark contrast to the "pure euphoria" of phenethylamines such as MDMA.

Legality

2C-T-8 is unscheduled and uncontrolled in the United States, but possession and sales of 2C-T-8 will probably be prosecuted under the Federal Analog Act because of its structural similarities to 2C-T-7. However, 2C-T-8, unlike many other phenethylamines has not been sold by internet retailers. In the wake of Operation Web Tryp in July 2004, the issue of possession and sales of 2C-T-8 and other similar chemicals will probably be resolved in the courtroom as will the fate of this rare but unique psychedelic.

Canada
As of October 31, 2016, 2C-T-8 is a controlled substance (Schedule III) in Canada.

Pharmacology

The mechanism that produces 2C-T-8's hallucinogenic and entheogenic effects has not been specifically established, however it is most likely to result from action as a 5-HT2A serotonin receptor agonist in the brain, a mechanism of action shared by all of the hallucinogenic tryptamines and phenethylamines for which the mechanism of action is known.

Dangers

The toxicity of 2C-T-8 is not well documented.  2C-T-8 is somewhat less potent than 2C-T-7, but it may be expected that at higher doses it would display similar toxicity to that of other phenethylamines of the 2C-T family.

There have been no confirmed deaths due to 2C-T-8, though this may in part be due to its rarity and limited usage. Of the 2C-T family, there have been a few confirmed deaths due to 2C-T-7, which involved either insufflating large (>30 mg) doses and in one case an unknown oral dose was combined with 200 mg MDMA.

Popularity

2C-T-8 is unknown on the black market.  Limited accounts of 2C-T-8 can be found in the book PiHKAL.

References

2C (psychedelics)
Thioethers
Cyclopropyl compounds